Wunna Theikdi Stadium is a multi-use stadium in Naypyidaw, Myanmar. It can seat 30,000 spectators.  The stadium hosted the 2013 Southeast Asian Games and 2014 ASEAN Para Games opening and closing ceremonies. In addition, it hosted the events of 2015 National Sports Festival and 2018 ASEAN University Games. Currently, it is hosting state and region sports competitions. There are offices of Myanmar Olympic Committee and Department of Youth Affairs of Ministry of Sports and Youth Affairs.

History
On 31 May 2010, Myanmar Olympic Committee was awarded the right to host the 27th SEA Games in 2013. The games are planned to be held mainly in the new capital, Naypyitaw. New infrastructure needed for the games were built in Zabuthiri Township and Zeyarthiri Township of Naypyitaw and Chanmyathazi Township of Mandalay.

A large sports complex was built on 150 acres of land in Pyinyatheikdi Ward of Zabuthiri Township. The Sports Complex project include main stadium, indoor stadium, aquatic center, tennis court, futsal stadium, archery field and training grounds. Originally called Zambu Thiri Stadium, it was later renamed Wunna Theikdi Stadium. Similar to this stadium are Mandalarthiri Stadium in Mandalay and Zayarthiri Stadium in Zayarthiri Township. These stadiums are the first stadiums in Myanmar which were fully roofed.

The stadium was built by Max Myanmar, owned by Zaw Zaw.

Architecture and design
Wunna Theikdi Stadium is oval in shape, 263 meters long, 231 meters wide and 25 meters high. The stands are in three stages. There is a runway between the lawn and the stands. Meeting rooms, Living rooms and (15) acres of parking space are also included.

2013 Football Violence
After the construction of the stadium, the match between Yangon United and Nay Pyi Taw Football Team was played on August 4, 2013, before the start of the 2013 Southeast Asian Games. During the match, players from both sides clashed. In addition, the host Nay Pyi Taw fans smashed the benches and came down to the field and attacked the referee and the opposing team players. This is one of the worst events in the history of the Myanmar National League. The violence destroyed more than 150 seats at the new stadium.

Prominent Events

2013 SEA Games and 2014 ASEAN Para Games
The stadium hosted the opening and closing ceremonies of 27th SEA Games and 7th ASEAN Para Games. It also hosted the athletic events of the games.

2015 NSF
The stadium hosted the 2015 National Sports Festival's football matches and closing ceremony.

19th AUG
The stadium hosted the football matches of 19th ASEAN University Games in 2018.

References

Athletics (track and field) venues in Myanmar
Football venues in Myanmar
Buildings and structures in Naypyidaw
Sports venues completed in 2012